One Day More is a 2011 Italian comedy film directed by Massimo Venier. The film is adapted from the novel of the same name written by Fabio Volo, star of the film alongside Isabella Ragonese. However, the film plot is quite different from the book, radically changing the concepts and development of it.

Cast 
Fabio Volo: Giacomo Pasetti
Isabella Ragonese: Michela
Pietro Ragusa: Dante
Stefania Sandrelli: Mother of Giacomo
Roberto Citran: Ricardi
Hassani Shapi: Chandry
Camilla Filippi: Silvia
Irene Ferri: Alice
Luciana Littizzetto: Boldrini
Lino Toffolo: Fausto
Valeria Bilello: Alessia

See also   
 List of Italian films of 2011

References

External links

Films directed by Massimo Venier
2011 films
Italian romantic comedy films
2011 romantic comedy films
Films based on Italian novels
2010s Italian-language films
2010s Italian films